The Blekinge-class submarine is the next generation of submarines developed by Kockums for the Swedish Navy, also known as the A26 type. 

First planned at the beginning of the 1990s, the project was called "U-båt 2000" and was intended to be ready by the late 1990s or early 2000. With the end of the Cold War the naval threat from the Soviet Union disappeared and the new submarine class was deemed unnecessary. The project lay dormant for years until the mid-2000s when the need for a replacement for the  became apparent.

In February 2014 the project was cancelled because of disagreements between Kockums's new German owners, ThyssenKrupp, and the Swedish government. ThyssenKrupp refused to send a complete offer to any potential buyer, and demanded that each one buyer pay for the entire development rather than sharing the cost. The cancellation resulted in the Kockums equipment repossession incident on 8 April 2014. As per protocol, The Swedish government repossessed all equipment belonging to Defence Materiel Administration (Sweden), as well as all secret blueprints and images, using an armed escort. By orders from a manager, Kockums staff tried to sabotage the repossession by locking the gates with the repossession crew and escort still inside.

Maritime Today on 18 March 2015 reported that the project was restarted after the Swedish government placed a formal order for two A26 submarines for a maximum total cost of SEK 8.2 bn (approximately US$945 Million as of 18 March 2015). According to the article, a Letter of Intent (LOI) had earlier been signed by Saab and FMV (The Swedish Defence Material Administration) in June 2014 regarding the Swedish Armed Forces’ underwater capability for the period 2015–2024. Saab has since acquired Kockums. The order in question for the two A26 submarines has been placed with what is now "SAAB Kockums." These were to be delivered no later than 2022, a date subsequently pushed back, initially to 2024-24 and subsequently even further to 2027-28.

Features 
The submarine would displace 1,900 tonnes and have a crew complement of between 17 and 31 men. The 2008–2010 military budget memorandum to the Minister for Defence by the Supreme Commander Håkan Syrén would require the type to cost no more than the current Gotland class (about 1.5 billion SEK). The new submarine would have blue water capability, something earlier Swedish submarines have lacked. It will be equipped with modified AIP stirling propulsion and GHOST (Genuine HOlistic STealth) technology, making the submarine extremely quiet. It will also be designed to withstand significant shock loads from underwater explosions and would be able to "Launch and recover vehicles" through its torpedo tubes. The submarine's sail would largely be composed of the same material that was used when constructing the s.

There are three variants available: the Pelagic, Oceanic, and Oceanic (Extended Range). The entire Blekinge-class submarine family has been offered for export equipped with 18 vertical launch cells for Tomahawk cruise missiles.

Orders 
On 25 February 2010 Kockums AB signed a contract with the Swedish Defence Materiel Administration (FMV) concerning the overall design phase of the next-generation submarine. Kockums CEO, Ola Alfredsson, stated that "This is an important first step, not only for Kockums, but for the Swedish Armed Forces as a whole. We shall now be able to maintain our position at the cutting edge of submarine technology, which is vital in the light of current threat scenarios."

The Royal Norwegian Navy had shown interest in the project and could be interested to buy several submarines in the future. According to Kockums AB orders must be made by the end of 2010.

The plans also included a Mid-Life Upgrade program of two submarines of the Gotland class. Additional submarines could later be ordered to replace the Gotland class, however this will not be decided before 2020.

On 16 June 2010, the Swedish Parliament authorised the government to procure two new submarines. Kockums states that construction of two A26 submarines will generate about 170 jobs.

The first submarine was planned to be laid down by the end of 2012, but as of 2013 no submarines have yet been ordered. In September 2013 it was announced that the project had been delayed because of construction issues and the first submarine would not be ready before 2020.

Order cancelled and alternatives 
On 27 February 2014 the Swedish Defence Materiel Administration (FMV) cancelled its plans for ordering the A26 submarine from Kockums. According to FMV the new Kockums owner, the German company Thyssen Krupp has refused to allow Sweden to share the cost with any other nation, making the submarine too expensive.  Sweden has instead approached Saab. Saab plans to rehire many of Kockums submarine engineers if they receive orders for a new submarine. As a result, Saab recruited top people from Kockums and issued a press release that the company was seeking employees for its naval division.  In a letter to the Swedish Defence Materiel Administration, FMV, the head of the German ThyssenKrupp Marine Division, Dr. Hans Atzpodien begs FMV to stop Saab from recruiting key personnel from Kockums. On 2 April 2014 the Swedish government officially terminated all talks about a deal with ThyssenKrupp.

On 14 April 2014 about 200 employees had left Thyssen Krupp for Saab and it was reported that Saab and Thyssen Krupp had started to negotiate about selling Kockums. In June 2014 Thyssen Krupp agreed to sell Kockums to Saab.

On 22 July 2014 it was announced that Saab had bought Kockums from Thyssen Krupp for 340 million SEK. The new name will be Saab Kockums.

On 12 September 2014, Saab Kockums proposed a 4,000-ton variant of the submarines, known as the type 612, for the Royal Australian Navy to replace their ageing Collins-class submarine, however the DCNS entry based on the Shortfin Barracuda class was selected instead.

In December 2014 an agreement between Saab and Damen Shipyards was announced to jointly develop, offer and build next-generation submarines (based on the Type 612 design). Initially focused on replacing the four s currently in use by the Royal Netherlands Navy by 2025 combined with the still existing Swedish submarine requirements after cancellation of the previous A26 program.

During a visit to Kockums facilities on 30 June 2015 the Swedish defence minister, Peter Hultqvist,  announced that two submarines will be ordered for a cost of 8.2 billion SEK (US$ ). The two submarines were to be delivered to the Swedish Navy in 2024 and 2025.  However, in 2021 it was indicated that the delivery date had slipped by a further three years, to 2027–28, and the costs had risen by SEK5.2 billion (or USD600 million).

A26 Blekinge submarines have been offered to Polish Navy as a possible choice for the "Orka" modernization programme which is to be introduced by 2025.

Units
Italics indicate estimates

See also 
 
 Type 212 submarine - A class of diesel-electric attack-submarines developed by ThyssenKrupp Marine Systems and exclusively built for the German Navy, the Italian Navy and the Royal Norwegian Navy.
 Type 214 submarine - A class of export-oriented diesel-electric attack-submarines, also developed by ThyssenKrupp Marine Systems and currently operated by the Hellenic Navy, the Portuguese Navy, the Republic of Korea Navy and the Turkish Naval Forces.
 Type 218SG submarine - A class of extensively-customised diesel-electric attack-submarines developed ThyssenKrupp Marine Systems and currently operated by the Republic of Singapore Navy.
  - A class of extensively-customised diesel-electric attack-submarines developed by ThyssenKrupp Marine Systems and currently operated by Israel.
  - A unique class of  diesel-electric attack-submarines developed by ThyssenKrupp Marine Systems and currently being built for Israel.
  - A class of export-oriented diesel-electric attack-submarines, jointly developed by Naval Group and Navantia and currently operated by the Chilean Navy, the Royal Malaysian Navy, the Indian Navy and the Brazilian Navy.
 S-80 Plus submarine - A class of conventionally-powered attack-submarines, currently being built by Navantia for the Spanish Navy.
 KSS-III submarine - A class of diesel-electric attack submarines, built by Daewoo Shipbuilding & Marine Engineering and Hyundai Heavy Industries and operated by the Republic of Korea Navy.
  - A class of diesel-electric attack-submarines, built by Mitsubishi Heavy Industries for the Japan Maritime Self-Defense Force.
  - A class of diesel-electric attack submarines currently being built by Mitsubishi Heavy Industries and Kawasaki Heavy Industries for the Japan Maritime Self-Defense Force
 Type 039A submarine - A class of diesel-electric attack-submarines operated by the People's Liberation Army Navy (China) and being built for the navies of the Royal Thai Navy and the Pakistan Navy.
  - A class of diesel-electric attack-submarines being built for the Russian Navy.

References

External links
 The A26 Submarine on Saab Kockums's official website

Submarines of Sweden
Proposed ships